Brookesia betschi, commonly known as Blanc's leaf chameleon or the Marojejy leaf chameleon, is a species of lizard in the family Chamaeleonidae. The species is endemic to Madagascar.

Taxonomy
B. betschi was originally described by Édouard-Raoul Brygoo, Charles Pierre Blanc and Charles Antoine Domergue in 1974.

Etymology
The specific epithet, betschi, honours French biologist Jean-Marie Betsch.

Geographic range and habitat

Conservation status
The International Union for Conservation of Nature has rated the Marojejy leaf chameleon as Near Threatened due to the loss of rainforest in northern Madagascar. This species has very specialised microhabitat requirements and does not tolerate disturbance. It is threatened by destruction of the forest for agriculture by slash and burn and logging. Although its range is fragmented into a number of separate blocks, each one is thought to be large enough to support a viable population.

Behaviour
The Marojejy leaf chameleon is diurnal, spending the day searching through leaf litter for insects and other small invertebrates. If it is disturbed, it remains motionless, relying on its cryptic colouration to provide camouflage. It perches on low trees and plants at night, when it is most easily spotted.

Reproduction
B. betschi is oviparous.

References

Further reading
Glaw F, Vences M (2006). A Field Guide to the Amphibians and Reptiles of Madagascar, Third Edition. Cologne, Germany: Vences & Glaw Verlag. 496 pp. .

Brookesia
Reptiles described in 1974
Taxa named by Édouard-Raoul Brygoo
Taxa named by Charles Pierre Blanc
Taxa named by Charles Domergue
Reptiles of Madagascar
Endemic fauna of Madagascar